25I-NB3OMe (2C-I-NB3OMe, NB3OMe-2C-I) is a derivative of the phenethylamine hallucinogen 2C-I, which acts as a highly potent partial agonist for the human 5-HT2A receptor.

Legality

United Kingdom

United States 
25I-NB3OMe is not a controlled substance, but is a positional isomer of 25I-NBOMe and thus may be considered a Schedule I drug under the Federal Analogue Act, meaning that it would be subject to the same penalties for possession, distribution, and manufacture as 25I-NBOMe.

References 

2C (psychedelics)
Designer drugs